Eurolamp WRT (commonly known as just Eurolamp) is a Ukrainian rally team, currently competing in the World Rally Championship-2. Originally named MacCoffee Rally Team, the team was established in 2002 by Valeriy Gorban to compete in the Ukrainian Rally Championship, who entered a Mitsubishi Lancer Evolution IX in the 2009 Rally Poland. The team expanded to include a second car during the 2010 season for Oleksandr Saliuk, Jr., and a third car for Oleksiy Kikireshko in 2011, and contesting the World Rally Championship for Group N Production Cars. The team returned in 2012, with Gorban placing third overall in the Production championship, scoring a class victory at the Acropolis Rally and podium finishes at the Rally Argentina and Rally d'Italia. The team's best result overall to date was eighth place at the 2011 Rally Australia, achieved by Saliuk, who left the team at the end of the season.

Following the introduction of Group R regulations in 2013 and the restructuring of the secondary World Rally Championship categories, Eurolamp switched to campaigning in the WRC-2 with Mini John Cooper Works S2000 cars supported by British motorsport firm Prodrive.

Complete WRC results

Overall classifications

By class

Notes:
 Rallies marked in italics were not contested as a round of the championship.

References

External links
 

World Rally Championship teams
Mini (marque)
Sports teams in Ukraine